ERKE is a sportswear brand owned by the Chinese company HongXing Erke Group. The brand specializes in footwear and sportswear and has sponsored major sports icons within the Chinese Olympic team. Erke was also the official kit sponsor for the Korea DPR national football team.

Erke was also the official apparel sponsor for the 2012 WTA Tour Championships and Shanghai ATP 1000 tennis tournament, and the Qatar Open table tennis tournament.

It is reported that Hongxing Erke’s revenue in 2020 will be 2.8 billion, and its net profit will be a loss of 220 million.

Sponsorship

Olympic Committees 
 Croatia

Football 
 Gombak United FC

Tennis

Players

  Yanina Wickmayer
  Andreas Beck
  Benjamin Becker
  Philipp Petzschner
  Mischa Zverev
  Tommy Robredo
  Vania King

Teams
  Germany Fed Cup team

References

External links
 

Companies based in Fujian
Clothing companies established in 2000
Chinese brands
Athletic shoe brands
Sportswear brands